Zyablikovo District  is an administrative district (raion) of Southern Administrative Okrug, and one of the 125 raions of Moscow, Russia. As of 2017, it had a population of 131,297.

See also
Administrative divisions of Moscow

References

Notes

Sources

Districts of Moscow